Twin Nunataks are two small nunataks lying between Ricker Hills and Hollingsworth Glacier in the Prince Albert Mountains, Oates Land. Descriptively named by the Southern Party of the New Zealand Geological Survey Antarctic Expedition (NZGSAE), 1962–63.

Nunataks of Oates Land